Paul Schulze (born 1962) is an American actor.

Paul Schulze may also refer to:

 Paul Schulze (architect) (1827/28-1897), German-born architect who practised in Boston, Massachusetts; see Boylston Hall
 Paul Schulze (cyclist) (1882-1918), German cyclist who competed at the 1908 Summer Olympics
 Paul Schulze (zoologist) (1887-1949), German amateur taxonomist who specialised in ticks
 Paul Schulze (officer), Wehrmacht soldier who was awarded the Knight's Cross of the Iron Cross in 1943
  (1883-1966), a German National People's Party politician
 Paul Schulze (Ontario politician), independent candidate in the 1985 Ontario provincial election

See also
 Paul Schultz (1891-1964), general in the Wehrmacht
 Paul Schultz (rugby league) (active 1961-1968), New Zealand
 Paul Schultze-Naumburg (1869-1949), German architect, painter, publicist and politician
 Paul Schulz (1898-1963), German military officer and Nazi Party official